Mechthild is a female Germanic given name. It is an old form of the first name Mathilde and means "powerful in combat, powerful fighter". Bearers of this name include:

People 
 Mechthild of Bavaria (1532–1565), German noblewoman
 Mechthild of the Palatinate (1418–1482), princess and literary patron (Mechthild of Germany)
 Mechthild of Magdeburg (1207– c. 1282/1294), medieval German mystic
 Mechtild of Holstein (1220/1225–1288), wife of Danish king Abel 
 Mechthild of Hackeborn (1241–1299), cistercian und christian mystic
 Mechthild of Sayn (c. 1203 – c. 1291), wife of Henry III, Count of Sayn (Mechthild of Landsberg)
 Mechthild of Bienburg (c. 1223 – c. 1265), abbess of Buchau Abbey
 Mechthild of Baden (died 1258), countess of Württemberg
 Mechthild of Diessen (c. 1125–1160), abbess of Edelstetten (Mathilde von Andechs)
 Mechthild of Giessen (c. 1155 – c. 1203), countess of Giessen
 Mechthild Heil (born 1961), German politician
 Mechthild Großmann (born 1948), German actress and dancer 
 Mechthild of Hesse (1490–1558) countess of Tecklenburg-Schwerin 
Mechthild Rawert (born 1957), German politician

See also 
 873 Mechthild, main-belt asteroid